The 1977 Prix de l'Arc de Triomphe was a horse race held at Longchamp on Sunday 2 October 1977. It was the 56th running of the Prix de l'Arc de Triomphe.

The winner was Alleged, a three-year-old colt trained in Ireland by Vincent O'Brien and ridden by Lester Piggott. Alleged became the fourth Irish-trained horse to win the race twice after Ballymoss (also trained by O'Brien) in 1957 and Levmoss in 1970. Piggott had previously won the race on Rheingold in 1973.

The contenders
The favourite for the race was Alleged, who had won four of his five races including the Royal Whip Stakes, Gallinule Stakes and Great Voltigeur Stakes. His main rivals in the betting were the British filly Dunfermline, who had inflicted Alleged's only defeat in the St Leger Stakes, the Prix du Jockey Club winner Crystal Palace, the four-year-old Crow, and the five-year-old Orange Bay. The best of the other French contenders appeared to be Malacate (Irish Derby), Kamicia (Prix Vermeille) and Fabuleux Jane. The international entry included the New Zealand-bred, British-trained Balmerino, Mia from Argentina, Cunning Trick from the United States and Vivi from Germany. Alleged started at odds of 3.9/1 ahead of Crystal Palace, Dunfermline and Orange Bay on 8/1 and Crow on 19/2.

The race
Piggott sent Alleged into the lead from the start and set a steady pace with Crystal Palace, Crow and Orange Bay close behind. With no designated pacemakers and none of the recognised stayers making any attempt to challenge for the lead, the Irish colt was allowed to dictate the pace and on the downhill run towards the turn into the straight he led from Crystal Palace, Crow, Montcontour, Orange Bay and Yelpana. On the final turn, Alleged accelerated clear of the field and opened up a lead of four lengths. Although several horses made progress in the closing stages, Alleged was never seriously challenged and won by one and a half lengths from Balmerino, with Crystal Palace taking third, just ahead of Dunfermline and Crow. The winning time was 2:30.6.

Race details
 Sponsor: none
 Purse: 
 Going: Good to Firm
 Distance: 2,400 metres
 Number of runners: 26
 Winner's time: 2:30.6

Full result

* Abbreviations: ns = nose; shd = short-head; hd = head; snk = short neck; nk = neck

Winner's details
Further details of the winner, Alleged.
 Sex: Colt
 Foaled: 4 May 1974
 Country: United States
 Sire: Hoist The Flag; Dam: Princess Pout (Prince John)
 Owner: Robert Sangster
 Breeder: June McKnight

References

Prix de l'Arc de Triomphe
 1977
Prix de l'Arc de Triomphe
Prix de l'Arc de Triomphe
Prix de l'Arc de Triomphe